Luis Miranda is a city councillor from Montreal, Quebec, Canada. He is the mayor of the Anjou borough. He was a member of the Union Montreal municipal political party, but is now a member of Equipe Anjou.  Since January 2009, he has been on the city's executive committee, responsible for city services, the city's 3-1-1 telephone service, economic development, the committee for east end city councillors, and as the city's representative in the non-profit Montreal International organization.

Miranda has served as a city councillor in Anjou since 1989. In 1997, he was elected as mayor of the city of Anjou, and following its merger with Montreal in 2001, was elected as the borough mayor of Anjou. He was re-elected borough mayor in 2005, 2009, 2013, 2017 and 2021.

References

External links
Luis Miranda (Union Montreal)
Luis Miranda - Borough of Anjou

Montreal city councillors
Living people
Mayors of places in Quebec
People from Anjou, Quebec
21st-century Canadian politicians
Year of birth missing (living people)